The 2011–12 Saudi Professional League (known as the Zain Professional League for sponsorship reasons) was the 36th season of the Saudi Professional League, the top Saudi professional league for association football clubs, since its establishment in 1976. The season began on 9 September 2011, and ended on 18 April 2012. Al-Hilal were the defending champions. The league was contested by the 12 teams from the 2010–11 season as well as Al-Ansar and Hajer, who joined as the promoted clubs from the 2010–11 First Division. They replace Al-Hazem and Al-Wehda who were relegated to the 2011–12 First Division.

On 14 April, Al-Shabab won their sixth League title on the final matchday after a 1–1 draw away to runners-up Al-Ahli. Al-Shabab ended the season without a single defeat becoming the second team to ever do so in a 26-game league season and the third team overall.

Al-Ansar were the first team to be relegated following a 1–0 home defeat against Al-Raed on 31 March. Al-Qadisiyah became the second and final team to be relegated following a 3–2 defeat away to Al-Nassr on 13 April.

Teams
Fourteen teams competed in the league – the twelve teams from the previous season and the two teams promoted from the First Division. The promoted teams were Al-Ansar (returning after an absence of six years) and Hajer (returning after an absence of twelve years). They replaced Al-Hazem (ending their six-year top-flight spell) and Al-Wehda (ending their eight-year top-flight spell).

Stadiums and locations

Note: Table lists in alphabetical order.

Personnel and kits 

 1 On the back of the strip.

Managerial changes

Foreign players
The number of foreign players is restricted to four per team, including a slot for a player from AFC countries.

Players name in bold indicates the player is registered during the mid-season transfer window.

League table

Results

Season statistics

Scoring

Top scorers

Hat-tricks 

Notes
(H) – Home team(A) – Away team

Most assists

Clean sheets

Discipline

Player 
 Most yellow cards: 10
 Mishaal Al-Saeed (Al-Ittihad)

 Most red cards: 2
 Abdoh Hakami (Al-Raed)
 Bandar Musaad (Najran)

Club 
 Most yellow cards: 69
 Al-Ittihad

 Most red cards: 6
 Al-Ahli

Attendances

By team

†

†

Awards

Arriyadiyah Awards for Sports Excellence
After a partnership of five years, it was announced that Mobily would no longer sponsor the award. The Arriyadiyah Awards for Sports Excellence were awarded for the sixth time since its inception in 2007. The awards were sponsored by Saudi newspaper Arriyadiyah and Saudi marketing company RPM. The awards were presented on 16 December 2012.

Al-Riyadiya Awards
The Al-Riyadiya Awards were awarded for the third time since its inception in 2010. The awards were presented on 13 May 2012.

Best Goalkeeper:  Waleed Abdullah (Al-Shabab)
Best Defender:  Osama Al-Muwallad (Al-Ittihad)
Best Midfielder:  Taisir Al-Jassim (Al-Ahli)
Best Attacker:  Nasser Al-Shamrani (Al-Shabab)
Player of the Year:  Nasser Al-Shamrani (Al-Shabab)
Young Player of the Year:  Salem Al-Dawsari (Al-Hilal)

References

External links 
 Saudi Arabia Football Federation 
 Saudi League Statistics

Saudi Professional League seasons
Saudi Professional League
Professional League